PCB Challengers are a Pakistani women's cricket team that compete in the Pakistan Women's One Day Cup and the PCB Women's Twenty20 Tournament. The team has no geographical base, instead being made up of some of the best players from across Pakistan. They are captained by Omaima Sohail and coached by Azam Khan. They won the first two Women's Twenty20 Tournaments, and the most recent One Day Cup.

History
PCB Challengers were formed in 2018, ahead of the 2017–18 PCB Triangular One Day Women's Tournament. They were captained by Sidra Ameen. They finished second in the group, winning one of their four matches, progressing to the final. They lost the final to PCB Dynamites by 190 runs. The following season, 2018–19, Challengers, captained by Nida Dar, finished bottom of the group, again winning one of their four matches.

In 2019–20, PCB Challengers also competed in a new competition, the PCB Triangular Twenty20 Women's Tournament. They finished top of the group stage of the T20 tournament, and then went on to beat PCB Blasters in the final by 6 wickets to claim their first title. Challengers batter Muneeba Ali was the leading run-scorer in the competition. In the one-day competition, Challengers topped the group stage, with three wins from four matches, but lost to Blasters in the final.

In 2020–21, only the T20 tournament was played. PCB Challengers finished top of the group, winning two of their four matches, with two abandoned. They then beat PCB Dynamites in the final by 7 runs to claim their second T20 title in two years. In 2021–22 the side competed in the newly renamed Pakistan Women's One Day Cup, captained by Javeria Khan. Challengers won five of their six matches in the group stage to top the group, qualifying for the final where they beat PCB Blasters by 68 runs to claim their first one-day title. In 2022–23, they finished bottom of the group in the Women's Twenty20 Tournament, with one victory.

Players

Current squad
Based on squad for the 2022–23 season. Players in bold have international caps.

Seasons

Pakistan Women's One Day Cup

PCB Women's Twenty20 Tournament

Honours
 Pakistan Women's One Day Cup:
 Winners (1): 2021–22
 PCB Women's Twenty20 Tournament:
 Winners (2): 2019–20 & 2020–21

References

Women's cricket teams in Pakistan
2018 establishments in Pakistan